Blackhill may refer to:
Blackhill, Consett, an area in Consett, County Durham, England
Blackhill, Glasgow, an area of Glasgow, Scotland
Blackhill, Aberdeenshire, a small Scottish village passed through by A952 road
Blackhill, County Fermanagh, a townland in County Fermanagh, Northern Ireland
Blackhill, County Londonderry, a townland in County Londonderry, Northern Ireland
Blackhill and Consett Park, a park in Consett, County Durham, England

See also
Black Hill (disambiguation)
Black Hills (disambiguation)